Yoshimatsu : Guitar Works “Tender Toys” is a studio album performed by classical guitarist Shin-Ichi Fukuda, released in 1998 by Denon Records. Recorded between the 23–24 April and the 20–21 May 1997 at Salamanca Hall, Gifu, the album was produced by Hiroyuki Okano. The album consists of a number of compositions by the Japanese composer Takashi Yoshimatsu for classical guitar.

The track is named after the composer's Tender Toys and includes performances of nearly all the pieces from the collected works. The CD also has performances of a number of Yoshimatsu's guitar compositions, including; Around the Round Ground, Water Color Scalar and 4 Little Dream Songs.

Performers 
All tracks are performed by Shin-ichi Fukuda on classical guitar, although tracks 8,10, 21 and 23 are performed as duets, featuring Kazufumi Matsunaga on guitar. Tracks 3, 9, 13, 14, 20 and 25 are also played as duets and feature harmonicist Yasuo Watani. Yoshimatsu also played the bells on track 7.

Track listing

References

External links 
 http://homepage3.nifty.com/t-yoshimatsu/ Takashi Yoshimatsu
 https://web.archive.org/web/20120426000720/http://www.yasuowatani.com/02pro_e.html
 http://web.me.com/cadenza_fukuda/E/Profile.html

1998 albums